Jurie Snyman (born 20 February 1995) is a South African cricketer. He made his first-class debut for Easterns in the CSA Provincial Three-Day Competition on 1 November 2012.

He was the leading run-scorer in the 2017–18 CSA Provincial One-Day Challenge tournament for Easterns, with 378 runs in six matches.

In September 2018, he was named in Easterns' squad for the 2018 Africa T20 Cup. In September 2019, he was named in Easterns' squad for the 2019–20 CSA Provincial T20 Cup. In April 2021, he was named in Easterns' squad, ahead of the 2021–22 cricket season in South Africa.

References

External links
 

1995 births
Living people
South African cricketers
Easterns cricketers
Place of birth missing (living people)